Thomas Bate was an English footballer who played in the Football League for Blackpool, his only known club. He made 24 League appearances and scored one goal during the 1905–06 season.

References

English footballers
English Football League players
Year of birth missing
Year of death missing
Blackpool F.C. players
Association football outside forwards